Chengetayi Mapaya (born 19 December 1998) is a Zimbabwean track and field athlete who specializes competing in triple jump. He has won two NCAA Division I championships competing for the TCU Horned Frogs at the collegiate level in the United States. Competing internationally for his home country, he took home the gold medal at the 2017 African U20 Championships and has qualified for the 2022 World Championships.

Career
Growing up in Harare, Zimbabwe, Mapaya attended high school at the private St. George's College. He won gold in the triple jump and silver in the long jump at the 2016 African Union Sports Council Region 5 U20 Youth Games in Angola, then took gold in the triple jump at the 2017 African U20 Championships in Tlemcen, Algeria, where he set a new meet record with a 16.30m jump.

After high school, Mapaya relocated to the United States to attend Texas Christian University in Fort Worth, Texas. During his time competing in triple jump for the Horned Frogs, he won two NCAA Division I national championships, five Big 12 conference championships and earned All-American honors nine times.

Achievements
All information taken from World Athletics profile.

Collegiate championship results

 = did not finish
 = disqualified
 = personal best
 = national (American) record
 = collegiate record

National titles
 NCAA Division I Men's Outdoor Track and Field Championships
 Triple jump: 2019, 2022

References

External links

TCU Horned Frogs bio

1998 births
Living people
Zimbabwean triple jumpers
TCU Horned Frogs men's track and field athletes
World Athletics Championships athletes for Zimbabwe
Sportspeople from Harare